The Copenhagen School is a term given to "schools" of theory originating in Copenhagen, Denmark.  In at least four different scientific disciplines a theoretical approach originating in Copenhagen has been so influential that they have been dubbed "the Copenhagen School"

 Copenhagen School (quantum physics) — centered on the theories developed by Niels Bohr
 Copenhagen School (theology) — centered on a theoretical framework developed by Thomas L. Thompson, Niels Peter Lemche and others. Also called the School of Minimalist Theology.
 Copenhagen School (international relations), security studies — centered on ideas by  Barry Buzan, Ole Wæver and Jaap de Wilde.
 Copenhagen School (linguistics) — centered on the linguistic theories developed by Louis Hjelmslev, and later formed into the "Copenhagen school of functional linguistics".
 Copenhagen School (painting)